Galabov (from гълъб meaning pigeon or dove) is a Bulgarian masculine surname, its feminine counterpart being Galabova, and may refer to:
Plamen Galabov (born 1995), Bulgarian footballer
Rumen Galabov (born 1978), former Bulgarian footballer

References 

Bulgarian-language surnames